Canadian singer and songwriter Carly Rae Jepsen started her discography with her self-released EP Dear You followed by Tug of War, her debut album, which was released in September 2008, four years later. The album spawned two Canadian Hot 100 top 40 singles, "Tug of War" and "Bucket", both of which were accredited gold certifications by Music Canada (MC). Her second album, Kiss, was released in September 2012. "Call Me Maybe", also the lead single from her 2012 EP Curiosity, attained international success, reaching number one in Canada, Australia, the United Kingdom and the United States, among others. Curiosity went on peak at number six on the Canadian Albums Chart. Its title track was released as its second single, peaking at number 18 in Canada. The same year, she collaborated with American artist Owl City on the single "Good Time". The song topped the charts in Canada and New Zealand and reached the top ten in several other countries, including Australia, Ireland, United Kingdom and the United States.

Jepsen's third album, Emotion, was released in 2015 and is influenced by songs from the 1980s. Its lead single "I Really Like You", peaked at number 14 in Canada and attained top five and top 40 positions in the UK and US, respectively. The second single, "Run Away with Me", was released in July. Jepsen has had nine singles chart within the Top 50 of the Canadian Hot 100, two of which reached number one. After the success of Emotion, she released a remix album based on the album, entitled Emotion Remixed +, and a compilation of 8 tracks that did not make it onto her third studio album, entitled Emotion: Side B.

In 2019, Jepsen released her fourth album, Dedicated. The album was preceded by the release of the singles "Party for One", "Now That I Found You", "No Drug Like Me", "Julien," and "Too Much". The album peaked at number 16 on the Canadian albums chart, and at number 18 on the US Billboard 200. A year later, Dedicated Side B was released as Jepsen's fifth album. The album serves as a companion album to Dedicated (2019). The album features songs that did not make the cut for the original album.

Jepsen released her fifth album, The Loneliest Time, in 2022. The album was preceded by the release of its lead single, "Western Wind", which was followed by "Beach House", "Talking to Yourself", and its title track, "The Loneliest Time".

Released songs

Unreleased songs

References 

 
Jepsen, Carly Rae